Steve Scoffham (born 12 July 1983) is an English former professional footballer who played as a striker.

Early life 
Born in Germany to British parents, Scoffham grew up in the Nottingham area and attended Chilwell Comprehensive School.

Career 
Scoffham began his career at Gedling Town. His transfer to Notts County was assisted by a £5,000 donation from the Notts County Supporters Trust Following the 2005–2006 season, he was released by the new County manager Steve Thompson.

Scoffham joined Burton Albion in the Summer of 2006 on a free transfer. During November 2006, he was loaned to Alfreton Town where he re-united with Gary Mills.

It was announced on 22 September 2007 that he had signed for local amateur club Attenborough.

In June 2009, he was set to sign for Hucknall Town, but no deal was agreed.

Steve is now a co-owner of a successful building company 'Profile Build' in Toton, Notts, specialising in new builds, extensions and renovations.

References

External links
 
 

1983 births
Living people
English footballers
Association football forwards
English Football League players
National League (English football) players
Gedling Town F.C. players
Notts County F.C. players
Burton Albion F.C. players
Alfreton Town F.C. players
Attenborough F.C. players